ACMV may refer to:

 Air conditioning and mechanical ventilation, see HVAC
 African cassava mosaic virus, a plant pathogen
 Ateliers de Constructions Mécaniques de Vevey, a Swiss engineering company (rail vehicles)
 Acanthamoeba castellanii mamavirus (ACMV)